The Potez 36 was a French two-seat touring or sport monoplane designed and built by Potez. The Potez 36 was a high-wing braced monoplane with a conventional landing gear. It had an enclosed cabin with side-by-side seating for a pilot and passenger. The design had some unusual features like folding wings to make it easier to store or to tow behind a motor car. Some of the aircraft had Potez-designed leading-edge slats. The aircraft was popular with both French private owners and flying clubs with a small number being used by the French Air Force during the 1930s as liaison aircraft.

Variants

Potez 36
Prototype of the series powered by a  Salmson 5Ac radial engine.
Potez36/1
production version powered by a  Renault 4Pa; two built.
Potez 36/3
Prototype followed by six production aircraft with no slats, powered by a  Salmson 5Ac radial engine.
Potez 36/5
Variant with no slats but powered by a   Salmson 7Ac engine; five built.
Potez 36/13
Production version of the 36/5 but fitted with leading-edge slats, 96 built.
Potez 36/14
Variant with a  Renault 4Pb engine and leading-edge slate and wheel brakes, 103 built.
Potez 36/15
Variant with a   Potez 6Ab engine, 18 built.
Potez 36/17
Variant with a   Cirrus Hermes IIB engine, two built.
Potez 36/19
Variant with a   Renault 4Pci engine, two built.
Potez 36/21
Production variant with a   Potez 6Ac engine and wheels with balloon tyres, 29 built.

Specifications (Potez 36/3)

References

Notes

Bibliography

 

1920s French civil utility aircraft
036
Single-engined tractor aircraft
High-wing aircraft
Aircraft first flown in 1929